Vanistendael is a Belgian surname. It may refer to:

 August Vanistendael (1917-2003), Belgian trade union leader and Catholic social activist
 Frans Vanistendael (1942-2021), Belgian expert on tax law and former professor
 Judith Vanistendael (born 1974), Belgian comics author, illustrator

Surnames